Izmis Lake is a lake in Swat District, Khyber Pakhtunkhwa, Pakistan, located to the south-west of Utror valley at a high altitude above the tree line. The name Izmis means "caves" in Kohistani, and as the lake is surrounded by several natural caves, the people have named the lake after these caves. A small jeep-able link road from Utror leads towards the location of the lake, which ends in a valley called Loypanrghalay. The lake can be accessed from here after trekking for almost 3–6 hours.

See also
Katora Lake - Kumrat Valley
Saidgai Lake - Swat Valley
Mahodand Lake - Kalam Valley
Kundol Lake - Kalam Valley
Daral Lake - Swat Valley
List of Tourist attractions in Swat - List of tourist attractions in Swat

References

External links
 Izmis Lake - paktrips.com
 In pictures: Mirror-like Izmis glacial lake draws tourists to Utror valley - Dawn.com
 Izmis Danda (Lake) - valleyswat.net
 Trek To Izmis Lake - explorerpakistan.com
 Izmis Lake - Google Maps
 Izmis Lake, Utror Valley, Swat, KPK Pakistan - ecency.com
 Izmis Lake Swat Valley - tourbee
 Izmis Lake - ghoomlo.pk

Videos
 Izmis Lake , Utror - Swat Valley
 Izmis lake | Kalam Bandha | Swat Valley
 Pari Lakes and Izmis Lake in bad weather | Jahaz Pass Expedition | Part 2
 22 Lakes expedition utror to izmis waterfall and lake swat valley kpk
 Travelling to Izmis Lake From Utror Valley | Pedestrian track | Short Documentary | Sherin Zada

Lakes of Khyber Pakhtunkhwa
Tourist attractions in Swat
Swat District